Peresekino is a rural locality (a village) in Novoselskoye Rural Settlement, Kovrovsky District, Vladimir Oblast, Russia. The population was 2 as of 2010.

Geography 
Peresekino is located 27 km southwest of Kovrov (the district's administrative centre) by road. Pestovo is the nearest rural locality.

References 

Rural localities in Kovrovsky District